Wayne Maurice Edwards (born March 7, 1964) is an American former professional baseball pitcher for the Chicago White Sox of the Major League Baseball(MLB). He was drafted by the White Sox in the 10th round of the 1985 Major League Baseball Draft. He was the drummer with V.I.E.W., an alternative rock band whose lead vocalist was fellow White Sox pitcher Jack McDowell. His father Wayne Sr. was the drummer with The Hondells. He is a 2007 Azusa Pacific University Athletics Hall of Fame inductee.

References

External links
Baseball Almanac
Baseball-Reference

1964 births
Living people
Albuquerque Dukes players
American expatriate baseball players in Canada
Azusa Pacific Cougars baseball players
Bakersfield Blaze players
Baseball players from California
Birmingham Barons players
Chicago White Sox players
Daytona Beach Admirals players
Major League Baseball pitchers
Peninsula White Sox players
Sportspeople from Burbank, California
Syracuse Chiefs players
Toledo Mud Hens players
Vancouver Canadians players